Dearraindrop is an artist collective based in Virginia Beach, Virginia. Dearraindrop incorporates diverse disciplines that work together to create multifaceted sculptures and installations. Part of the collective's operating philosophy is modeled on the idea that our greatest human capability is the ability to work together to achieve a greater goal. Dearraindrop work incorporates painting, collage, video, large-scale, interactive installation pieces, and hand-fabricated musical instruments.

Joe Grillo and Laura Grant founded Dearraindrop in 1998 as a clothing line. The collective is currently composed of three artists: Joe Grillo, Laura Grant, and  Billy Grant. In the past, Dearraindrop has worked with a digital electrician Owen Osborn  Chris Kuscinski and painter Alika Herreshoff.

In 2010 Joe Grillo and Laura Grant moved their studio to Brooklyn, New York, and are producing work for upcoming exhibitions in Los Angeles, New York, and Norway.

Selected solo exhibitions
2011

"Facemaker", "Royal/T", Culver City, California.

2010 

"Hot Glue Hullabaloo" , "The Hole", New York, New York.

2008

Hidden In, V1 Gallery, Copenhagen, Denmark.

Computer Game Blues,  Philadelphia Institute for Advanced Study, Philadelphia, Pennsylvania.

Scared Straight,  Perugi Artecontemporanea, Padua, Italy.

2007

Sci-fi Classicsx  GAD, Oslo, Norway

Qualquer Bobagem, Iconic Gallery, Lisbon, Portugal  

2006

Concrete Trees, Glass Grass, and Cream-filled Stones, Loyal Gallery, Stockholm, Sweden. Swedish rock band Träd, Gräs & Stenar performed live at the opening.

V-B, V1 Gallery, Copenhagen, Denmark.

W.Epaminondas Adrastus Blab, Katherine Mulherin Contemporary Art, Toronto, Canada

2005

Magic Brain, Perugi Artecontemporanea, Padua, Italy.

2004

Riddle of the Sphinx at Deitch Projects. This installation was also shown at the  Art Basel Miami International Art Fair.

Tylenol Island, P.S.1 Contemporary Art Center, Queens, New York.

Selected group exhibitions
2011

"Facemaker", Royal/T, Culver City, California

2010

"Hot Glue Hullabaloo" , The Hole NYC, New York, New York, a collaboration with artist Kenny Scharf

2007

Mad Love, Arken Museum of Modern Art, Denmark.

2004

Dreamland Artist Club, Coney Island, Brooklyn. Curated by Steve Powers.

Books
2006

Magic Brain

2005

Off/On. Preface written by culture critic and curator Carlo McCormick.

Music recordings

2005

Asidd Rainn LP

References

External links
Dearraindrop Homepage
PS1 Museum Press Release
The Future of the Future at Kavi Gupta Gallery, Chicago
HaNNa Gallery, Tokyo
Contemporary Art Gallery, Vancouver, Canada
Asidd Rain LP
The Hole NYC's DEARRAINDROP Artist Guide

American artist groups and collectives
Arts organizations based in Virginia
Virginia culture